Thailand will compete at the 2017 World Championships in Athletics in London, United Kingdom, from 4–13 August 2017.

Results
(q – qualified, NM – no mark, SB – season best)

Men

Combined events – Decathlon

Women

Field events

References

Nations at the 2017 World Championships in Athletics
World Championships in Athletics
Thailand at the World Championships in Athletics